Lars Eidinger (born 21 January 1976) is a German actor. Eidinger started his career at Deutsches Theater in 1997. Before his breakthrough, he played minor roles in German television shows like Schloss Einstein (2002) and Berlin, Berlin (2003). In February 2016, he was nominated as one of the judges for the main competition section of the 66th Berlin International Film Festival. He is a member of the ensemble of the Schaubühne theatre in Berlin, with leading roles in Thomas Ostermeier productions such as Hamlet and Richard III.

Eidinger was one of the first signers of the Open Letter to the German Position on Russo-Ukrainian War on late April 2022, demanded that Germany not support Ukraine with arms in order to "prevent a third world war". 

Eidinger lives in Berlin, is married and has a daughter. He has appeared in German and international film and television productions.

Selected filmography

Film

 2005: See You at Regis Debray
 2009: Everyone Else
 2011: Hell
 2012: Goltzius and the Pelican Company
 2012: Home for the Weekend
 2014: Clouds of Sils Maria
 2015: Dora or the Sexual Neuroses of Our Parents
 2015: Sworn Virgin
 2015: 
 2016: The Origin of Violence
 2016: Personal Shopper
 2016: The Bloom of Yesterday
 2017: Matilda
 2018: Never Look Away
 2018: High Life
 2018: Cut Off
 2018: Mackie Messer – Brechts Dreigroschenfilm
 2018: 25 km/h
 2019: Proxima
 2019: Dumbo
 2019: All My Loving
 2020: My Little Sister
 2020: Persian Lessons
 2022: About Joan
 2022: White Noise

Television
 2003: Berlin, Berlin (TV series, 1 episode)
 2008: Großstadtrevier (TV series, 1 episode)
 2010: Tatort: Hauch des Todes (TV film)
 2012: Tatort: Borowski und der stille Gast (TV film)
 2013: Foyle's War
 2013: Grenzgang (TV film)
 2013: Polizeiruf 110: Der Tod macht Engel aus uns allen (TV film)
 2013: Der Wagner-Clan. Eine Familiengeschichte (TV film)
 2015: Tatort: Borowski und die Rückkehr des stillen Gastes (TV film)
 2016:  (TV film)
 2017: Shades of Guilt (TV series, 1 episode)
 2017: SS-GB (miniseries)
 2017: Sense8  (Netflix series, 4 episodes)
 2017–present: Babylon Berlin (TV series)
 2019: M – Eine Stadt sucht einen Mörder (miniseries)
 2020: Gott von Ferdinand von Schirach (TV film)
 2021: Ich und die Anderen (miniseries)
 2021: Faking Hitler (miniseries)
 2021: Tatort: Borowski und der gute Mensch (TV film)
 2021: Tatort: Murot und das Prinzip Hoffnung (TV film)
 2022 : Irma Vep (miniseries)

Music videos
 2014: Herbert Grönemeyer - Morgen
 2017: Love Hotel Band - Diamant
 2018: Drangsal - Eine Geschichte/Und Du?
 2019: Deichkind - Richtig gutes Zeug
 2019: Deichkind - Wer sagt denn das?
 2019: Deichkind - Keine Party
 2019: Deichkind - Dinge

References

External links

1976 births
Living people
20th-century German male actors
21st-century German male actors
German male film actors
German male stage actors
German male television actors
Male actors from Berlin